Changeables was a toy series produced by McDonald's and given as the prize inside a Happy Meal. The series took advantage of the transformable robot gimmick popularized in the 1980s, only the Changeables turned into popular McDonald's menu items.

There were three series produced in 1987, 1989 and 1990.

The original series featured six food items that transformed into unnamed robots. The second series included redeco versions of two series one robots (Big Mac and Large Fries) and six new molds. Series two also gave the robots names. Series three consisted of eight new toys that became dinosaurs instead of robots. This set reused food items from previous series but were new molds, with the exception of the ice cream cone, remolded from series two, and the Happy Meal that was new to the line.

Intended for use by small children, the Changeables line of toys was surprisingly sturdy as each figure was made from fairly thick plastic and typically contained only three moving parts. This made changing the individual figures from food item to robot/dinosaur and back fairly easy even for those within the intended age range. There were also some under-3 (U-3) toys in the sets that did not transform.

Two Changeables (Cheeseburger and Happy Meal-O-Don) were released as part of the Happy Meal's 40th anniversary surprise toy assortment. These were new molds based on the originals with minor color and sculpting changes. In particular, the Hamburger Changeable's food mode is new to the line, despite reusing the robot mode of the Quarter Pounder.

Series 1 (1987)
Big Mac
Large Fries
McNuggets Box
Milk Shake
Egg McMuffin
Quarter Pounder
(U-3) Pals Changeable Cube

Series 2 (1989)
Big Mac / Macro Mac (Re-color from Series 1)
Large Fries / Fry Force (Re-color from Series 1)
Small Soft Drink / Krypto Cup
Small Fries / Fry Bot
Hot Cakes / Robo-Cakes
Quarter Pounder Box / Gallacta Pounder
Cheeseburger / C2
Ice Cream / Turbo Cone
(U-3) Pals Changeable Cube

Series 3 (1990)
Happy Meal-O-Don
McDino Cone
Hot Cakes-O-Dactyl

Big Mac-O-Saurus Rex
Tri-Shake-atops
McNuggets-O-Saurus
Quarter Pounder with Cheese-O-Saur
(U-3) Bronto Cheeseburger
(U-3) Small

40th Anniversary Surprise Series (2019)
Hamburger (robot mode modeled after Quarter Pounder from Series 1)
Happy Meal-O-Don

References

External links
 Series 1 (archived version)
 Series 2 (archived version)
 Series 3 (archived version)
 History of Generation 1 toy line

1980s toys
McDonald's characters
Transforming toy robots